In mathematics, a Størmer number or arc-cotangent irreducible number is a positive integer  for which the greatest prime factor of  is greater than or equal to . They are named after Carl Størmer.

Sequence
The first few Størmer numbers are:

Density
John Todd proved that this sequence is neither finite nor cofinite.

More precisely, the natural density of the Størmer numbers lies between 0.5324 and 0.905.
It has been conjectured that their natural density is the natural logarithm of 2, approximately 0.693, but this remains unproven.
Because the Størmer numbers have positive density, the Størmer numbers form a large set.

Application
The Størmer numbers arise in connection with the problem of representing the Gregory numbers (arctangents of rational numbers)   as sums of Gregory numbers for integers (arctangents of unit fractions).

References

Integer sequences